"Murder Dem" is a song by Nigerian rapper and record producer Jesse Jagz. It was released on December 2, 2012, by Chocolate City. The song was originally intended to be included on Jesse Jagz's second studio album, Jagz Nation, Vol.1. Thy Nation Come (2013), but was ultimately removed from the final track listing due to Jagz's departure from Chocolate City.

Sample and performance
The song samples the church hymn, "Joyful, Joyful, We Adore Thee". Jesse Jagz first performed the song on the reality TV show, Nigerian Idol.

Music video
The music video for "Murder Dem" was directed by MEX films. It was uploaded to YouTube on February 27, 2013, at a total length of 3 minutes and 47 seconds. In the video, Jesse Jagz plays the general of Jagz Nation, a fictional character, who is on Nigeria's "most wanted list". Throughout the music video, several newspaper headlines hinted to the possible assassination and capture of the general. In addition, footage of the Nigerian Army was shown in the video. Moreover, footages of Bob Marley and Fela Kuti were also shown. The video's primary scene was a room equipped with a television set and posters on the wall.

Critical reception
Upon its release, the song received positive reviews from music critics. A writer for Nigerian Sounds said, "The track showcases Jesse's Avant Garde production style beginning with the popular Christmas carol, "Joyful Joyful" and the bars alert people that "he's been gone for a minute but he's back like he left sum'n!"

Accolades
The music video for "Murder Dem" was nominated for Most Gifted Ragga/Dancehall Video at the 10th Annual Channel O Music Video Awards, which took place at the Walter Sisulu Square in Kliptown, Soweto on November 30, 2013.

Track listing
 Digital single

References

2012 songs
2012 singles
Jesse Jagz songs
Reggae songs
Song recordings produced by Jesse Jagz